Artyk is the name of multiple inhabited localities in Russia and Turkmenistan.

Urban localities
Artyk, Sakha Republic, an urban-type settlement in Oymyakonsky District of the Sakha Republic

Rural localities
Artyk, Turkmenistan, a village in Artyk geňeşligi, Kaka District, Ahal Province
Artyk, Udmurt Republic, a village in Vasilyevsky Selsoviet of Krasnogorsky District in the Udmurt Republic